Red Devils Chojnice is a Polish futsal club located in Chojnice, Poland. It currently plays in Ekstraklasa. The team's colors are red and white.

Current squad 

Coach:  Vlastimil Bartošek

External links
 

Futsal clubs in Poland
Futsal clubs established in 1995
1995 establishments in Poland
Chojnice County
Sport in Pomeranian Voivodeship